Potamophylax is a genus of insects belonging to the family Limnephilidae. The species of this genus are found in Europe and Northern America.

Species
The following are included in BioLib.cz:
 Potamophylax albergaria Malicky, 1976
 Potamophylax borislavi Kumanski, 1975
 Potamophylax carpathicus (Dziędzielewicz, 1912)
 Potamophylax cingulatus (Stephens, 1837)
 Potamophylax coronavirus Ibrahimi, Bilalli & Vitecek, 2021
 Potamophylax gambaricus Malicky, 1971
 Potamophylax goulandriorum Malicky, 1974
 Potamophylax gurunaki Malicky, 1992
 Potamophylax haidukorum Malicky, 1999
 Potamophylax inermis Moretti & Cianficconi, 1994
 Potamophylax juliani Kumanski, 1999
 Potamophylax jungi Mey, 1976
 Potamophylax latipennis (Curtis, 1834)
 Potamophylax luctuosus (Piller & Mitterpacher, 1783)
 Potamophylax millenii (Klapalek, 1899)
 Potamophylax nigricornis (Pictet, 1834)
 Potamophylax pallidus (Klapalek, 1899)
 Potamophylax rotundipennis (Brauer, 1857)
 Potamophylax schmidi Marinkovic-Gospodnetic, 1971
 Potamophylax seprus J. Olah, O Lodovici & M Valle, 2011
 Potamophylax winneguthi (Klapálek, 1902)

References

Limnephilidae
Trichoptera genera
Insects of Europe
Insects of North America
Taxa named by Hans Daniel Johan Wallengren